Shayna Maree McDowell (born 15 April 1989) is an Australian former professional tennis player.

McDowell, a player from the Sunshine Coast, was considered a bright prospect, ranked amongst the world's top 100 juniors. She represented Australia at the Junior Fed Cup.

In 2006 she made her WTA Tour main draw debut as a wildcard at the Canberra International, then a week later partnered Jessica Moore in the women's doubles main draw of the Australian Open.

Her career was derailed by shoulder injuries, which forced her to have keyhole surgery in 2008. After two years out of the game, she returned in 2010 and won an ITF tournament in Cantanhede, Portugal.

ITF finals

Singles: 4 (1–3)

Doubles: 1 (1–0)

References

External links
 
 

1989 births
Living people
Australian female tennis players
Tennis people from Queensland
Sportspeople from the Sunshine Coast